PCW can stand for:

Science and technology
 Polycrystalline Wool, a fiber mainly used for thermal insulation

Computing
 Amstrad PCW series of word processing computer systems
 Personal Computer World, a British computer magazine
 Popular Computing Weekly, another British computer magazine
 PC World (magazine), a computer magazine originated in the US

Other
 Canada's Wonderland, a theme park in Vaughan, Ontario, Canada, formerly named Paramount Canada's Wonderland
 Park Chan-wook, a South Korean film director
 Preston City Wrestling, a British professional wrestling promotion
 Portuguese Colonial War, an armed conflict
 Post-consumer waste, a waste type
 Price Comparison Website